NCAA Final Four 2003 is a video game developed by Killer Game and published by Sony Computer Entertainment America for PlayStation 2 in 2002.

Reception

The game received "mixed" reviews according to the review aggregation website Metacritic.

References

2002 video games
Basketball video games
NCAA video games
North America-exclusive video games
PlayStation 2 games
PlayStation 2-only games
Video games developed in the United States
Video games set in 2003
Video games set in the United States